Pashmak is a form of Iranian candy floss or cotton candy, made from sugar.
Pashmak is served on its own or as an accompaniment to fruits, cakes, ice creams, puddings and desserts. It is widely known as Persian Cotton Candy. It is sometimes garnished with ground pistachio nuts. Although the texture is similar to cotton candy, both method and ingredients are different.

Pashmak originated in the Iranian city of Yazd known for its various traditional Persian sweets such as Baghlava, Qottab, and Gaz during Safavid Empire.

Similar sweets
The Arabic sweet ghazal al banat (see ghazal) is virtually identical to pashmak, and is referred to as Oriental Cotton Candy.

A Turkish sweet called pişmaniye bears some resemblance to pashmak.

See also
Dragon's beard candy — a Chinese variant

References

External links
 Pashmak — Persian Fairy Floss — myfavouriteplum.blogspot.com
 Pishmaniye — photo on flickr
 Yazdi, tabrizi, and Wooden cotton candy — Introduction

Iranian desserts
Confectionery
Persian words and phrases